The Maran District is a district in Pahang, Malaysia. Bera district is founded at 1981. Located in the centre of Pahang, the district is surrounded by Kuantan District, Pekan District, Rompin District, Bera District, Temerloh District and Jerantut District clockwisely.

History

Previously Maran was a town council under the administration of the district of Pekan District. In January 1981, Maran town (Mukim Luit), together with some townships in Temerloh districts (Mukim Bukit Segumpal, Chenor, Kertau) were combined to form the new Maran district.

Administrative divisions

There are four mukims in Maran District:
 Bukit Segumpal
 Chenor
 Kertau
 Luit (Capital)

Federal Parliament and State Assembly Seats 
List of Maran district representatives in the Federal Parliament (Dewan Rakyat)

List of Maran district representatives in the State Legislative Assembly (Dewan Undangan Negeri)

Demographics

The following is based on Department of Statistics Malaysia 2010 census.

See also
 Districts of Malaysia

References

External links 

Official website of Maran District Council